John  Collins (born 27 April 1970) is the mainstay bass guitarist for Australian rock band Powderfinger since 1989. He is one of the founding members of the band, along with guitarist Ian Haug, forming at their high school, Brisbane Grammar School, as a three-piece. Powderfinger has released seven studio albums, a greatest-hits album, and a double CD live album. After they released their first best-of album, Fingerprints, in 2004, they decided to take a break. During the hiatus, Collins played with fellow Powderfinger member Darren Middleton in his new band Drag on a number of occasions as well as performing with Ian Haug and Steven Bishop in The Predators. Collins is often referred to as "J.C." by his fellow band members, as they are his initials and to distinguish him from the group's drummer Jon Coghill. Initially, the nickname was given to him following the group's song "JC" from their second album, Double Allergic, which referred to Jesus Christ.

Awards and nominations

APRA Awards
The APRA Awards are presented annually from 1982 by the Australasian Performing Right Association (APRA).

|-
|rowspan="2"| 2004 || Powderfinger – Bernard Fanning, Jon Coghill, Ian Haug, Darren Middleton, John Collins || Songwriter of the Year || 
|-
|"On My Mind" – Bernard Fanning, Darren Middleton, Collins, Ian Haug, Jon Coghill || Most Performed Australian Work || 
|-
|rowspan="2"| 2008 ||rowspan="2"| "Lost and Running" – Jon Coghill, Collins, Bernard Fanning, Ian Haug, Darren Middleton || Song of the Year|| 
|-
|Most Played Australian Work ||

References

1971 births
Living people
APRA Award winners
Australian rock bass guitarists
Male bass guitarists
Powderfinger members
21st-century bass guitarists
Australian male guitarists